The Longships in Harbour is a collection of poetry by Scottish author William McIlvanney. It was first published in 1970.

The poems in this collection deal largely with the poet's experiences of growing up in a working class area of Scotland, particularly his family life. The most famous and striking poem in the collection is "Initiation", a raw, intense poem in memory of his father.

Other themes dealt with throughout are poverty, famine, war, youth and innocence, and the passage of time.

1970 poetry books
Scottish poetry
Works by William McIlvanney
Eyre & Spottiswoode books